Jesper Seier (born 21 September 1965) is a Danish sailor and Olympic champion.

He won a gold medal in the Soling Class at the 1992 Summer Olympics in Barcelona, together with Jesper Bank and Steen Secher.

References

External links

1965 births
Living people
Danish male sailors (sport)
Sailors at the 1992 Summer Olympics – Soling
Olympic sailors of Denmark
Olympic gold medalists for Denmark
Olympic medalists in sailing
European Champions Soling

Medalists at the 1992 Summer Olympics